Valentin Bazon (born 13 January 1963) is a Romanian judoka. He competed in the men's heavyweight event at the 1992 Summer Olympics.

References

1963 births
Living people
Romanian male judoka
Olympic judoka of Romania
Judoka at the 1992 Summer Olympics
Sportspeople from Bucharest